Alexandra Peak is a mountain on Vancouver Island, British Columbia, Canada, located  southwest of Campbell River and  northwest of Mount Albert Edward.

Alexandra Peak is a member of the Vancouver Island Ranges which in turn form part of the Insular Mountains.

Name origin
The mountain was named for Alexandra, Princess of Wales.

See also
List of mountains of Canada
Monarchy in British Columbia
Royal eponyms in Canada

References

Vancouver Island Ranges
One-thousanders of British Columbia
Comox Land District